Moses Avigdor Chaikin (1852 - 17 June 1928) was a Russian-British rabbi and author.

Biography

Moses Avigdor Chaikin was born in Shklow, Mogilev Governorate, to Lubavitch parents Rabbi Israel Shraga and Chaya Dina Chaikin. At an early age he moved with his father to St. Petersburg, where the latter became chief shoḥet. Chaikin was educated for the rabbinate, and obtained several rabbinical diplomas, among others one from Rabbi  in Volkovysk and one from Rabbi Yitzchak Elchanan Spektor of Kovno.

After the pogroms of 1881–82 he emigrated to Paris, where he served as rabbi of the Polish Jews from 1883 to 1887; but then returned to Russia and was rabbi at Rostov-on-Don from 1888 to 1889. Being expelled from Russia in 1890, he went to England, and in 1892 was appointed rabbi of the New Hebrew Congregation in Sheffield. In 1901 he was appointed Chief Minister of the Federation of Synagogues, and in 1911 a dayan of the London Beth Din.

In August 1926 he retired and moved to Tel Aviv, where he died two years later.

Publications
  Translated into English in 1897.

References
 

1852 births
1928 deaths
19th-century English rabbis
19th-century rabbis from the Russian Empire
British emigrants to Mandatory Palestine
Burials at Trumpeldor Cemetery
Emigrants from the Russian Empire to France
Emigrants from the Russian Empire to the United Kingdom
English Jewish writers
English Orthodox rabbis
People from Shklow